The Baxin is a typical sweet originating from Liguria, Italy. It consists of anise seeds, sugar, flour and lemon. It has been made for some time — by the eighteenth century it was produced and sold by Benedictine monks in Liguria. The origin of Baxin is unknown.

The Baxin consists of few ingredients. They do not contain butter, eggs or preservatives. Their flavor is sugar, honey and lemon, with a marked accent of fennel. They have a yellow color.

The Baxin may be accompanied with white, red or Marsala wine.

See also
 Cuisine of Liguria
 List of Italian dishes

Italian desserts
Cuisine of Liguria